The Alliance of Democratic Forces for the Liberation of Congo-Zaire (ADFLC; ; AFDL) was a coalition of Rwandan, Ugandan, Burundian, and Congolese dissidents, disgruntled minority groups, and nations that toppled Mobutu Sese Seko and brought Laurent-Désiré Kabila to power in the First Congo War. Although the group was successful in overthrowing Mobutu, the alliance fell apart after Kabila did not agree to be dictated by his foreign backers, Rwanda and Uganda, which marked the beginning of the Second Congo War in 1998.

Background

By the middle of 1996, the situation in eastern Zaire was simmering with tension. Following the Rwandan genocide in 1994, hundreds of thousands of ethnic Hutus had fled across the border into Zaire where they settled in large refugee camps. Many of those responsible for the genocide, the former Rwandan Armed Forces (FAR) and interahamwe militia, used the anonymity offered by the camps to reorganize into the rebel Rassemblement pour le Retour et la Démocratie au Rwanda (RDR). The RDR began to use the camps as bases to infiltrate back across the border and conduct an insurgency.  Despite protests by the new government of Rwanda, the Zairian government and international organizations providing humanitarian aid to the camps were unwilling to remove the militants from the refugee population.

At the same time, the position of the Banyamulenge minority, ethnic Tutsis who had lived in Zaire for generations, was growing precarious. They had long been discriminated against for being relative newcomers to the region and having a different language and culture than neighboring tribes, part of Mobutu Sese Seko's strategy of encouraging a low level of internal discord in the country so an alliance would not form against him. The arrival of large numbers of Hutus, many of them militant Hutus who carried out attacks on Banyamulenge targets, had substantially upset what equilibrium existed. The Rwandan government also saw the Banyamulenge, as natural allies and had quietly armed and trained a substantial force in anticipation of what it felt to be an unstable situation.

Formation of the AFDL 
On 7 October 1996, the vice-governor based in the Kivu town of Bukavu proclaimed that the Banyamulenge were no longer welcome and would have to leave the country. In response, the Banyamulenge began an uprising against the local government, which was used as a pretext by the AFDL to start a war in Zaire, which was initially characterized as a tribal war quickly turned into something more. With support from the Rwandan government, the Banyamulenge managed to fend off an attack by the Zairian Armed Forces.  The rising tension between Rwanda and Zaire then led to an exchange of mortar fire over Lake Kivu between the two nations' armed forces. This violence involving the Banyamulenge in September–October 1996 is seen as the beginning of the First Congo War.

Seemingly out of nowhere, Laurent-Désiré Kabila, a former Marxist rebel who had spent most of the previous decade selling gold in Tanzania, appeared as head of his old rebel group, the Party of the Peoples' Revolution, which had been defunct. In a remarkably short period of time, Kabila found himself head of the new the AFDL, which also included the National Council of Resistance for Democracy (CNRD) led by André Kisase Ngandu, the Revolutionary Movement for the Liberation of Congo (MRLZ) led by Anselme Masasu Nindaga, and the Democratic Alliance of the People (ADP) led by Déogratias Bugera, often known as "Douglas". On October 18, a North Kivu Tutsi, Déogratias Bugera, became the first general secretary of the organization.

There has been much speculation about foreign involvement in facilitating the creation of the AFDL. Most of it swirls around Rwandan President Paul Kagame and Ugandan President Yoweri Museveni, both of whom knew Kabila very well. (Kabila had been introduced to Kagame and Museveni by Mwalimu Julius Nyerere, president of Tanzania). After an initial period of denial, since 1997 both Rwanda and Uganda have openly acknowledged the role they played in the formation of the AFDL and its military success. Rwanda and Uganda quickly threw the weight of their support behind the AFDL and sent forces across the Zairian border. Burundi, Angola, the rebels of southern Sudan, and the security forces of the province of Katanga, all of which had long-standing grievances with the Mobutu government, especially his sponsoring of foreign rebel groups to destabilize neighboring countries, also proved to be important backers of the AFDL.

The course of the war 

One of the first actions of the AFDL after it began to capture towns along the Zairian border was the dispersal of the large Hutu refugee camps that were offering safe haven to many RDR militants, an act humanitarian and human rights organizations fiercely criticized. As each camp was destroyed, the refugees fled to the next, creating camps with massive populations. One camp at Mugungu, north of Lake Kivu, reached 500,000 inhabitants, which is completely unmanageable by humanitarian organizations.  However, in fierce fighting in mid-November the Zairian government forces and RDR were either destroyed or forced out of the provinces of North and South Kivu. The Hutu refugees then split, about 800,000 fleeing back into Rwanda and several hundred thousand moving west into the Zairian jungles where many died of starvation and exposure to the elements or fell victim to attacks by various armed parties. The Rwandan Defence Forces and the AFDL carried out mass atrocities during the war, with as many as 222,000 Rwandan Hutu refugees going missing.

While Kabila, due to his international contacts and ability to speak multiple languages, was clearly the AFDL spokesperson, there was some question about who was the ultimate leader. André Kisase Ngandu, an elder insurgent with revolutionary credentials, was the president of the AFDL's military wing, the National Resistance Council (CNRD), and apparently expressed opposition to the massacre of Hutu refugees in Congolese camps. This internal tension between the two men was resolved on 4 January 1997, when Ngandu was assassinated in North Kivu by Rwandan Tutsi soldiers, allegedly at the instigation of Kabila and/or Rwandan President Paul Kagame. Kabila thereafter appointed himself president of the CNRD as well as retaining his position as spokesperson and head of the political wing.

Once the Kivus were secured, the remainder of the First Congo War consisted for the most part of the AFDL and its allies walking and driving across Zaire to the capital, Kinshasa. The population proved to have a deep antipathy towards Mobutu Sese Seko after decades of corruption and despotism. Most of the demoralized soldiers in the national army either joined the AFDL or deserted. Men from villages and towns throughout Zaire spontaneously joined the AFDL's advance. The AFDL was only slowed down by the country's decrepit infrastructure. In several parts of the country, no paved roads existed; the only links to the outside world were irregularly used dirt paths.

On 16 May 1997, after seven months of rebellion and the failure of peace talks, Mobutu fled the country. The AFDL marched into Kinshasa a day later. Kabila declared himself president and renamed the country to the Democratic Republic of the Congo (DRC). The AFDL then became the new national armed forces.

See also
 Politics of the Democratic Republic of the Congo

References

Bibliography

External links
What Kabila is Hiding: Civilian Killings and Impunity in Congo, Report by Human Rights Watch, October 1997
Congo backgrounder by Socialism Today – left wing perspective

Factions of the First Congo War
Zaire
Rebel groups in the Democratic Republic of the Congo
1996 establishments in Zaire